This article contains information about the literary events and publications of 1912.

Events

January 5 (December 23, 1911 O.S.) – Konstantin Stanislavski and Edward Gordon Craig's seminal symbolist Moscow Art Theater production of Hamlet opens.
January 21 – Joseph Conrad achieves his first popular success as the New York Herald begins serializing his novel Chance. He broke off with it in 1906, but sold the rights to the unfinished work in June 1911. Conrad continues to work on the book, while the first chapters appear weekly in the Herald. He completes it on March 26.
March 3 – Frieda Weekley meets D. H. Lawrence in Nottingham.
April 14–15 – The ocean liner  strikes an iceberg and sinks on her maiden voyage from the United Kingdom to the United States. American mystery writer Jacques Futrelle, English journalist and publisher William Thomas Stead and American bibliophile Harry Elkins Widener are among over 1500 dead. A copy of the Rubaiyat of Omar Khayyam in a jeweled binding by Sangorski & Sutcliffe (1911) is also lost. The event leads to a flood of poems, including Thomas Hardy's "The Convergence of the Twain".
May – Following the death of Lie Kim Hok from typhus in Batavia, Dutch East Indies, aged 58, Lauw Giok Lan takes on the work of completing his translations from the Dutch of Hugo Hartmann's Dolores, de Verkochte Vrouw into Sundanese as Prampoean jang Terdjoewal and of Geneviève de Vadans as De Juffrouw van Gezelschap.
June – Under the name I. G. Ofir, the Romanian poet Benjamin Fondane makes his publishing debut in the Iași magazine Floare Albastră, put out by A. L. Zissu.
August 10 – Virginia Stephen marries Leonard Woolf at St Pancras Town Hall in London. They honeymoon in Provence, Spain and Italy before returning.
September 21 – Harley Granville-Barker's production of Shakespeare's The Winter's Tale opens at the Savoy Theatre, London, with simplified scenery, ensemble acting and naturalistic verse-speaking.  It is replaced in November by his production of Twelfth Night. 
October
Edgar Rice Burroughs' character Tarzan (Viscount Greystoke, raised as a feral child by the fictional Mangani great apes) first appears in Tarzan of the Apes in the American pulp magazine The All-Story.
Sax Rohmer's character Fu Manchu (a "Yellow Peril" master criminal) first appears in "The Zayat Kiss" in the English pulp magazine Story-Teller, as the first installment of The Mystery of Dr. Fu-Manchu.
October 12 – Arthur Schnitzler's play La Ronde (Reigen, 1900) is first performed (without the author's consent), in Budapest. It is also first translated into French this year.
October 25 – The first issue of Simbolul is put out in Bucharest by Marcel Janco, Tristan Tzara and Ion Vinea.
December? (or at latest January 1913) – A Slap in the Face of Public Taste (Пощёчина общественному вкусу), the seminal text of Russian Futurism, is published as a manifesto and a poetry almanac. Edited and written by David Burliuk, Viktor Khlebnikov, Aleksei Kruchenykh and Vladimir Mayakovsky, it attacks the tradition of Russian Symbolism, notably works by Leonid Andreyev, Konstantin Balmont, Alexander Blok and Ivan Bunin, and ridicules independents such as Maxim Gorky.
unknown dates
The texts of 13 Sanskrit dramas, perhaps from the first centuries BCE and probably by Bhāsa (including the Svapnavasavadattam), are found by the scholar T. Ganapati Sastri in a palm-leaf codex in Kerala.
Publication of the Loeb Classical Library, parallel text editions of the classics begins at the London publisher Heinemann.

New books

Fiction
Mary Antin – The Promised Land
Arnold Bennett – The Matador of the Five Towns
E. F. Benson –  Mrs. Ames
Rhoda Broughton – Between Two Stools
Mary Grant Bruce – Mates at Billabong
Ivan Bunin – Dry Valley (Суходол, Sukhodo'l)
Willa Cather – Alexander's Bridge
J. Storer Clouston – The Mystery of Number 47
Joseph Conrad – The Secret Sharer
Grazia Deledda – Colombi e sparvieri (Pumpkins and Sparrows)
Ethel M. Dell
The Way of an Eagle
Sir Arthur Conan Doyle – The Lost World
Theodore Dreiser  – The Financier
Lord Dunsany – The Book of Wonder (short stories)
Edna Ferber – Buttered Side Down
Anatole France – Les Dieux ont soif
R. Austin Freeman
The Mystery of 31 New Inn
The Singing Bone
Kahlil Gibran – The Broken Wings (Al-Ajniha al-Mutakassira)
Elinor Glyn
Halcyone
Love Itself
The Reasons Why
Sarah Grand  – Adam's Orchard
Zane Grey – Riders of the Purple Sage
Knut Hamsun – The Last Joy (Den sidste Glæde)
Gerhart Hauptmann – Atlantis
Felix Hollaender – The Oath of Stephan Huller
Annie Fellows Johnston – Mary Ware's Promised Land
James Weldon Johnson – The Autobiography of an Ex-Colored Man
Franz Kafka
Contemplation (Betrachtung, short story collection, dated 1913)
The Judgement (Das Urteil)
Ada Leverson – Tenterhooks
D. H. Lawrence – The Trespasser
Stephen Leacock – Sunshine Sketches of a Little Town
Sinclair Lewis (as Tom Graham) – Hike and the Aeroplane
Julijonas Lindė-Dobilas – Blūdas; arba Lietuva buvusios Rusijos revoliucijos mete (Rampage)
Marie Belloc Lowndes – The Chink in the Armour
Oskar Luts – Kevade (Spring; part I)
John MacCormick – Dùn Aluinn (in book form)
Compton Mackenzie – Carnival
Thomas Mann – Death in Venice (Der Tod in Venedig)
Katherine Mansfield – "How Pearl Button Was Kidnapped" (short story)
Richard Barham Middleton – The Ghost Ship and Other Stories
E. Phillips Oppenheim
The Lighted Way
The Tempting of Tavernake
Baroness Orczy
The Traitor
The Good Patriots
Fire in Stubble
Meadowsweet
Eleanor H. Porter – Miss Billy's Decision
Forrest Reid – Following Darkness
Willie Riley – Windyridge
Saki – The Unbearable Bassington
Henryk Sienkiewicz – In Desert and Wilderness (W pustyni i w puszczy)
Hjalmar Söderberg – The Serious Game (Den allvarsamma leken)
James Stephens – The Crock of Gold
Sui Sin Far – Mrs. Spring Fragrance
Leo Tolstoy (died 1910) – Hadji Murat (Хаджи-Мурат)
Edgar Wallace – Private Selby
Hugh Walpole – The Prelude to Adventure
H. G. Wells – Marriage
Percy F. Westerman
Captured at Tripoli
The Flying Submarine
The Quest of the Golden Hope
The Sea Monarch
Edith Wharton  – The Reef
P. G. Wodehouse – The Prince and Betty
Stefan Żeromski – The Faithful River (Wierna rzeka)

Children and young people
L. Frank Baum
Sky Island
Phoebe Daring
Aunt Jane's Nieces on Vacation (as Edith Van Dyne)
The Flying Girl and Her Chum (as Edith Van Dyne)
Gerdt von Bassewitz
Little Peter's Journey to the Moon
Waldemar Bonsels
Die Biene Maja und ihre Abenteuer  (Maya the Bee and her Adventures)
Edgar Rice Burroughs
Tarzan of the Apes
A Princess of Mars
Jack London
A Son of the Sun
The Scarlet Plague
Lucy Maud Montgomery – Chronicles of Avonlea
E. Nesbit – The Magic World
Beatrix Potter – The Tale of Mr. Tod
Jean Webster – Daddy-Long-Legs

Drama
Arnold Bennett – Milestones
Paul Claudel – L'Annonce faite à Marie (The Tidings Brought to Mary, first performed)
George Diamandy – Rațiunea de stat (The Reason of State)
Dietrich Eckart – adaptation of Henrik Ibsen's Peer Gynt
Louis Esson – The Time Is Not Yet Ripe
John Galsworthy – The Eldest Son
Hugo von Hofmannsthal – Everyman, adapted as Jedermann
Stanley Houghton – The Younger Generation
Georg Kaiser – From Morning to Midnight (Von Morgens bis Mitternachts) (written)
Heinrich Mann – Die grosse Liebe (The Great Love, published)
J. Hartley Manners – Peg o' My Heart
Louis N. Parker – Drake of England
Arthur Schnitzler – Professor Bernhardi
George Bernard Shaw – Pygmalion (published)
G. K. Sowerby – Rutherford and Son
Bayard Veiller – Within the Law
I. C. Vissarion – Lupii (The Wolves, written)
Frank Wedekind - Tod und Teufel premiers in Berlin

Poetry

Anna Akhmatova – Vecher (Evening)
Edwin James Brady
Bells and Hobbles
The King's Caravan
Georgian Poetry 1911–12
David Burliuk, Aleksei Kruchenykh, Vladimir Mayakovsky and Velimir Khlebnikov – A Slap in the Face of Public Taste (Пощёчина общественному вкусу)
Pauline Johnson – Flint and Feather
Amy Lowell – A Dome of Many-Coloured Glass
Rabindranath Tagore (writer and translator) – Gitanjali (Song Offerings)

Non-fiction
Hilaire Belloc – The Servile State
Arnold Bennett – Those United States
Alexander Berkman – Prison Memoirs of an Anarchist
David Burliuk, Viktor Khlebnikov, Aleksei Kruchenykh, Vladimir Mayakovsky – A Slap in the Face of Public Taste (Пощёчина общественному вкусу)
Aleister Crowley – Magick (Book 4)
Albert Gleizes and Jean Metzinger – Du "Cubisme"
Henry H. Goddard – The Kallikak Family
Carl Jung – Psychology of the Unconscious (Wandlungen und Symbole der Libido)
Frigyes Karinthy – Így írtok ti (That's How You Write, literary parodies)
Pierre Loti – Un Pèlerin d'Angkor (A Pilgrimage to Angkor)
Donald Lowrie – My Life in Prison
Dumitru C. Moruzi – Pribegi în țară răpită
John Muir – The Yosemite
P. D. Ouspensky – Tertium Organum
Bertrand Russell – The Problems of Philosophy
Ernst Troeltsch –  Die Soziallehren der christlichen Kirchen und Gruppen (The Sociology of the Christian Churches and Groups)

Births
January 7 – Charles Addams, American cartoonist (died 1988)
January 15 – Celia Dale, English fiction writer and book reviewer (died 2011)
January 28 – Alison Adburgham (born Margaret Vere Alison Haig), English social historian and journalist (died 1997)
January 30 – Barbara Tuchman, American historian (died 1989)
February 10 – Ena Lamont Stewart, Scottish playwright (died 2006)
February 11 – Roy Fuller, English poet and novelist (died 1991)
February 12 – R. F. Delderfield, English novelist and playwright (died 1972)
February 15 – George Mikes, Hungarian-born English humorist (died 1987)
February 17 – Andre Norton, American sci-fi and fantasy author (died 2005)
February 20 – Pierre Boulle, French novelist (died 1994)
February 27 – Lawrence Durrell, English poet and novelist (died 1990)
March 7 – Dora Oake Russell, Newfoundland writer, diarist and journalist (died 1986)
March 12 – Kylie Tennant, Australian novelist, dramatist and historian (died 1988)
April 16 – Garth Williams, American children's writer and illustrator (died 1996)
April 24 – Marta Rădulescu, Romanian novelist and poet (died 1959)
May 3 – May Sarton, American writer (died 1995)
May 16 – Studs Terkel, American writer and broadcaster (died 2008)
May 20 – J. L. Carr, English novelist and publisher (died 1994)
May 27 – John Cheever, American writer (died 1982)
May 29 – Pamela Hansford Johnson, English poet, novelist and critic (died 1981)
June 20 – Anthony Buckeridge, English children's author (died 2004)
June 24 – Mary Wesley, English novelist (died 2002)
June 27 – E. R. Braithwaite, Guyanese-born novelist, teacher and diplomat (died 2016)
June 29 – John Toland, American Pulitzer Prize winning historian and biographer (died 2004)
July 3 – Elizabeth Taylor, English novelist (died 1975)
July 6 – Heinrich Harrer, Austrian explorer and author (died 2006)
July 14 – Northrop Frye, Canadian critic (died 1991)
July 17 – Michael Gilbert, English mystery and thriller novelist (died 2006)
August 4 – Virgilio Piñera, Cuban poet and short-story writer (died 1979)
August 10 – Jorge Amado, Brazilian writer (died 2001)
August 14 – Erwin Strittmatter, German writer (died 1994)
August 18 – Elsa Morante, Italian author (died 1985)
August 23 – Nelson Rodrigues, Brazilian author (died 1980)
c. September 5 – Sesto Pals, Romanian Israeli poet and philosopher (died 2002)
September 12 – J. F. Hendry, Scottish-born poet (died 1986)
September 24 – Ian Serraillier, English novelist and poet (died 1994)
October 31 – Oscar Dystel, American paperback publisher (died 2014)
November 8 – Monica Edwards, English children's author (died 1998)
November 12 – Donagh MacDonagh, Irish poet, playwright and judge (died 1968)
November 24 – Garson Kanin, American dramatist and screenwriter (died 1999)
November 25 – Francis Durbridge, English dramatist (died 1998)
November 26 – Eugène Ionesco, Romanian Absurdist playwright (died 1994)
December 4 – Ian Wallace, English science fiction writer (died 1998)

Deaths
January 7 – Sophia Jex-Blake, English medical writer and pioneer female physician (born 1840 in literature)
January 24 – James Allen, English self-help writer and poet (born 1864)
January 27 – Alexandre Bisson, French playwright, vaudeville creator, and novelist (born 1848) 
January 28 – Gustave de Molinari, Belgian economist (born 1819)
February 1 – Florence Huntley, American journalist, editor, humorist, and occult author  (born 1855)
February 2 – Annie Somers Gilchrist, American author  (born 1841)
February 7 – Edward Wilmot Blyden, Liberian pan-Africanist and President of Liberia College (born 1832)
February 8 – Girish Chandra Ghosh, Bengali poet, playwright and novelist (born 1844)
March 1 – George Grossmith, English comic singer and writer (born 1847)
March 30 – Karl May, German novelist (born 1842)
April 6 – Giovanni Pascoli, Italian poet (born 1855)
April 10 – Gabriel Monod, French historian (born 1844)
April 15 – In the wreck of 
Jacques Futrelle, American author (born 1875)
William Thomas Stead, English journalist (born 1849)
April 20 – Bram Stoker, Irish novelist and theatre manager (born 1847)
May 5 – Rafael Pombo, Colombian mathematician and poet (born 1833)
May 6 – Lie Kim Hok, Chinese writer, teacher and translator (born 1853)
May 14 – August Strindberg, Swedish dramatist (born 1849)
May 19 – Bolesław Prus, Polish novelist (born 1847)
June 4 – Eliza Archard Conner, American writer (born 1838)
June 13 – Alice Diehl, English novelist and concert pianist (born 1844)
July 20 – Andrew Lang, Scottish poet, novelist and critic (born 1844)
July 24 – Addison Peale Russell, American essayist (born 1826)
August 13 – Horace Howard Furness, American Shakespeare scholar (born 1833)
August 29 – Theodor Gomperz, Austrian philosopher (born 1832)
September 5 – Bertha Jane Grundy, English novelist (born 1837)
September 9 – Berta Behrens, German novelist (born 1850)
October 21 – Robert Barr, Scottish Canadian short story writer and novelist (born 1849)
November 30 – Dharmavaram Ramakrishnamacharyulu, Telugu dramatist (born 1853)
December 9 – Louis de Gramont, French journalist, dramatist and librettist (born 1855)
December 19 – Mir Mosharraf Hossain, Bengali novelist, playwright and essayist  (born 1847)
December 20 – Lucy Morris Chaffee Alden, American author, educator, and hymnwriter (born 1836)

Awards
Newdigate Prize: William Chase Greene, "Richard I Before Jerusalem"
Nobel Prize for Literature: Gerhart Hauptmann
Prix Goncourt: André Savignon, "Les filles de la pluie"

References

 
Years of the 20th century in literature